Dindica semipallens is a moth of the family Geometridae first described by Hiroshi Inoue in 1990. It is found on Flores in the Lesser Sunda Islands of Indonesia.

References

Moths described in 1990
Pseudoterpnini